Jõgeva SK Noorus is a football club based in Jõgeva, Estonia.

It has a reserve team, Vaimastvere SK Illi, that currently plays in the III Liiga.

Players

Current squad
 ''As of 28 July 2016.

Statistics

League and Cup

References

External links
 Official website 

Jõgeva
Football clubs in Estonia
Association football clubs established in 1996